Messy Situationz is the debut album by American rapper Messy Marv.

Track listing
 Ghetto Blues (Featuring The Madd Felon)
 Children's Story
 PHD's (featuring HK)
 In The Game
 Dank Session
 Messy Situationz
 A Poor Man's Dream (featuring JT The Bigga Figga & San Quinn)
 On The DL
 Ghetto Glamour Hood Hoe's
 Game To Be $old & Told
 Too Hot
 Freak Down (featuring Trev-G)
 The Back Streets
 The Chronic

References
 http://www.discogs.com/Messy-Marv-Messy-Situationz/release/1107198

1996 debut albums
Messy Marv albums
Gangsta rap albums by American artists